Gibson Ek Issaquah High School is a four-year public secondary school in Issaquah, Washington, United States, a suburb east of Seattle. It is one of four high schools in the Issaquah School District. It opened in the fall of 2016 at the previous location of Issaquah Middle School. Gibson Ek is a choice high school that places emphasis on real world experience. Students are allowed to explore career options with the help of volunteer mentors and are required to go to internships on Tuesdays and Thursdays.

References

External links 
 https://issaquah.wednet.edu/gibsonekhs

Public high schools in Washington (state)
Issaquah, Washington
High schools in King County, Washington